The Baby Dance is a 1998 drama film produced by Showtime about adoption. It was written and directed by Jane Anderson, based on her play of the same name, with Stockard Channing and Laura Dern starring in the lead roles.

Plot 
Wanda LeFauve is a poor mother of four with an unemployed husband living in a trailer outside Shreveport, Louisiana. Pregnant again, she finds a newspaper ad placed by a couple hoping to adopt a newborn. Summoning up her courage, Wanda makes the telephone call. The couple — Rachel and Richard Luckman — are wealthy, Jewish urbanites from Los Angeles. They skirt logistics, legal matters, fears and prejudices prior to the child's birth.

Cast
 Stockard Channing as Rachel Luckman
 Laura Dern as Wanda LeFauve
 Peter Riegert as Richard Luckman
 Richard Lineback as Al LeFauve
 Sandra Seacat as Doreen

Awards
The film was nominated for the Golden Globe Awards for Best Miniseries or Television Film and Best Actress – Miniseries or Television Film for both Dern and Channing.

At the Primetime Emmy Awards, the film was nominated for Outstanding Television Movie, Outstanding Lead Actress in a Limited Series or Movie for Stockard Channing and directing and writing for Jane Anderson.

The film received the prestigious Peabody Award. Channing was also nominated for the Independent Spirit Award for Best Supporting Female and the Screen Actors Guild Award for Outstanding Performance by a Female Actor in a Miniseries or Television Movie.

References

External links 
 

1998 television films
1998 independent films
1998 films
Films about adoption
American television films
Films set in Louisiana
Films set in the 1990s
Peabody Award-winning broadcasts
1990s English-language films